"Eye of the Beholder" (also titled "The Private World of Darkness" when initially rebroadcast in the summer of 1962) is episode 42 of the American television anthology series The Twilight Zone. It originally aired on November 11, 1960 on CBS.

Opening narration

Plot summary
Janet Tyler has undergone her eleventh treatment (the maximum number legally allowed) in an attempt to look normal. Her head is completely bandaged so that her face is entirely covered, and her face is described as a "pitiful twisted lump of flesh" by the nurses and doctor, lurking in the shadows of the darkened hospital room. The outcome of the procedure cannot be known until the bandages are removed. Unable to bear the bandages any longer, Janet pleads with the doctor and eventually convinces him to remove them early. As he prepares, the nurse says that she still is uneasy about Janet's appearance. The doctor becomes displeased and questions why Janet or anyone must be judged on their outer beauty. The nurse warns him not to continue in that vein, as it is considered treason.

The doctor removes the bandages, and announces that the procedure has failed, and her face has undergone no change: but Janet’s appearance is actually that of a classically beautiful looking woman based on the beauty standards of the world we live in. The doctor, nurses and other people in the hospital, however, are revealed as inhuman-looking, with drooping features, large, thick brows, sunken-in eyes, swollen and twisted lips, and wrinkled noses with extremely large nostrils, like pigs' snouts. Distraught by the failure of the procedure, Janet runs through the hospital as what is considered normal in this alternate society "State" is revealed. Flat-screen televisions throughout the hospital project an image of the State's leader giving a speech calling for greater conformity.

Eventually, a similarly attractive human-looking man named Walter Smith arrives to take the crying, despondent Janet Tyler into exile to a village of her "own kind", where her "ugliness" will not trouble the State. Before the two leave, Walter comforts Janet, saying that she will find love and belonging in the village, and that "beauty is in the eye of the beholder", meaning that even though the people from the State and their society might find Janet Tyler "ugly", others will find her beautiful.

Closing narration

Cast
Maxine Stuart as Janet Tyler (under bandages)
Donna Douglas as Janet Tyler (unmasked)
William D. Gordon as Doctor Bernardi
Jennifer Howard as Nurse
Edson Stroll as Walter Smith
George Keymas as The Leader
Joanna Heyes as Nurse #2

Production
Because of the complex makeup and camera angles, this was one of the most difficult episodes of The Twilight Zone to film. The director, Douglas Heyes, wanted the show to feature actors with sympathetic voices. To achieve this, he cast the episode with his back to the performers. Heyes had planned to have Maxine Stuart, who spoke all the lines of the main character Janet Tyler, when her head is entirely covered by bandages, dub the single line spoken by Tyler when she is revealed (as portrayed by the actress Donna Douglas). However, Douglas had been listening to Stuart's voice as she recorded her part, and was able to imitate her so successfully that she was allowed to speak the line on camera.

The original title for this episode was "Eye of the Beholder". Stuart Reynolds, a television producer, threatened to sue writer and producer Rod Serling for the use of the name. At the time, Reynolds was selling an educational film of the same name to public schools. Reruns following the initial broadcast featured the title screen "The Private World of Darkness". Because CBS consulted different prints over the years for syndication packages, the closing credits for this episode vary from one title to the other, depending on which television station is using which package. In The Twilight Zones original DVD release the syndicated version was marketed as an "alternate version". Other than the appearance of the title in the closing credits, however, there are no differences between the two "versions".

Serling, who wrote the episode, reused the theme for a later teleplay, "The Different Ones", for his series Night Gallery. "The Different Ones" takes place in a futuristic world where a disfigured hermit teenage boy is sent on a NASA rocket to a planet where the inhabitants are revealed to look like him. During the transfer he meets a conventionally handsome alien youth, who is going to Earth because of his own "disfigurement".

2003 remake

This episode was remade for the 2002–03 revival of the series using Serling's original script (but discarding Bernard Herrmann's original score), with Molly Sims as Janet Tyler, Reggie Hayes as Dr. Bernardi and Roger Cross as the Leader. The make-up was changed to make the faces look more melted, ghoulish and decayed with deep ridges. The remake follows the original script more faithfully. The projection screens were changed to plasma screens and more of the dialogue from the Leader's monologue was used.

See also
 List of Twilight Zone (1959 TV series) episodes
Weird Science #21 Sep/Oct 1953, "The Ugly One"

References

Bibliography
 Zicree, Marc Scott. The Twilight Zone Companion. Sillman-James Press, 1982 (second edition).
 DeVoe, Bill. (2008). Trivia from The Twilight Zone. Albany, GA: Bear Manor Media. 
 Grams, Martin. (2008). The Twilight Zone: Unlocking the Door to a Television Classic. Churchville, MD: OTR Publishing.

External links
 
 "Eye of the Beholder" Review at "The Twilight Zone Project"

The Twilight Zone (1959 TV series season 2) episodes
1960 American television episodes
Compositions by Bernard Herrmann
Television episodes set in hospitals
Television episodes written by Rod Serling
Television episodes about plastic surgery
Ugliness
Television episodes directed by Douglas Heyes
Works about totalitarianism